Nancy Carroll (born Ann Veronica Lahiff; November 19, 1903 – August 6, 1965) was an American actress. She started her career in Broadway musicals and then became an actress in sound films and was in many films from 1927 to 1938. She was then in television roles from 1950 to 1963. She received a star on the Hollywood Walk of Fame on February 8, 1960.

Life and career
Of Irish parentage, the daughter of Thomas and Ann Lahiff, Carroll was born in New York City. Her education came at Holy Trinity School in New York, but she left there at age 16 to work as a stenographer in an office of a lace manufacturer.

Carroll and her sister Elsie once performed a dancing act in a local contest of amateur talent. This led her to a stage career and then on to screen stardom. She began her acting career in Broadway musicals. She became a successful actress in sound films because her musical background enabled her to play in movie musicals of the 1930s. Her film debut was in Ladies Must Dress in 1927.

In 1928 she made eight films. One of them, Easy Come, Easy Go, co-starring Richard Dix, made her a movie star. In 1929 she starred in The Dance of Life with Hal Skelly, and The Wolf of Wall Street along with George Bancroft and Olga Baclanova. She was nominated for the Academy Award for Best Actress in 1930 for The Devil's Holiday. Among her other films are Laughter (1930), Paramount on Parade (1930), Hot Saturday (1932) with Cary Grant and Randolph Scott, The Kiss Before the Mirror (1933) directed by James Whale,  and Broken Lullaby aka The Man I Killed (1932) directed by Ernst Lubitsch. 

Under contract to Paramount Pictures, Carroll often balked at the roles the studio offered her, and she earned a reputation as a recalcitrant and uncooperative actress. In spite of her ability to successfully tackle light comedies, tearful melodramas, and even musicals, and as well as garnering considerable praise by the critics and public – she received the most fan mail of any star in the early 1930s – she was released from her contract by the studio. In the mid-1930s under a four-film contract with Columbia Pictures, she made four rather insignificant films and was no longer an A-list actress.

Carroll retired from films in 1938, returned to the stage, and starred as the mother in the early television series The Aldrich Family in 1950. In the following year, she guest-starred in the television version of The Egg and I, starring her daughter, Patricia Kirkland.

Death 
On August 6, 1965, Carroll was found dead after failing to arrive at the theater for a performance. The cause of her death was an aneurysm. She was 61 years old.

Hollywood Walk of Fame
For her contributions to the film industry, Carroll has a motion picture star on the Hollywood Walk of Fame at 1725 Vine Street. The star was dedicated February 8, 1960.

Filmography

References

External links

Photographs of Nancy Carroll
Set of Carroll portraits and promotional shots

1903 births
1965 deaths
Actresses from New York City
American film actresses
American silent film actresses
American musical theatre actresses
American television actresses
Deaths from aneurysm
American people of Irish descent
20th-century American actresses
Paramount Pictures contract players
20th-century American singers
20th-century American women singers